Grace is a photograph by Eric Enstrom. It depicts an elderly man with hands folded, saying a prayer over a table with a simple meal. In 2002, an act of the Minnesota State Legislature established it as the state photograph.

History and background

The original photograph was taken at Enstrom's photography studio in Bovey, Minnesota. Most sources indicate 1918 as the year, though Enstrom's daughter Rhoda, born in 1917, claimed to remember being present when the photograph was taken, which might have been around 1920. The man depicted in the photograph is Charles Wilden, who earned a meager living as a peddler and lived in a sod house. While the photograph conveys a sense of piety to many viewers, according to the Enstrom family's story, the book seen in the photo is actually a dictionary. However Wilden wrote "Bible" on the waiver of rights to the photo which he signed in exchange for payment, giving credence to the idea that, even if the actual prop used was a dictionary, it was a proxy representing a bible in the photograph. Likewise, local stories about Wilden "centered more around drinking and not accomplishing very much", than religious observation.

What happened to Wilden after the photograph is unknown. In 1926, he was paid $5 by Enstrom in return for waiving his rights to the photograph; he disappeared thereafter. After the photograph became popular, Enstrom attempted to track Wilden down but was unsuccessful. Numerous family members and local historians have also attempted to determine what became of Wilden, but have not been able to locate definitive evidence.

Enstrom first licensed the photograph to Augsburg Publishing House in 1930. In the 1940s, his daughter, Rhoda Nyberg, colorized the photo by hand. This version was featured in prints produced during the 1940s onward and became the more widespread and popularly known version of the photo.

Enstrom earned a modest sum from the photograph for the remainder of his life until his death in 1968. Nyberg died in 2012.

Legacy 
In 2014, the stage play Picturing Grace premiered, which presents a dramatized retelling of the story behind the photograph, its photographer and subject. The play premiered in Itasca County, the same region in which the photograph was captured.
  
The water tower in the town of Bovey, MN has the following words painted on the side: BOVEY /  / "GRACE".

The extremely deep lake (previously an iron ore mine) which borders Bovey on the west and north has not been named on any known map. A past resident of Bovey has used social media to promote the idea of naming it Lake Grace.

References

External links
Grace (Minnesota state photograph) in MNopedia: the Minnesota Encyclopedia
Grace, by Enstrom – Official, Enstrom family website

1918 works
1918 in art
1918 in the United States
Symbols of Minnesota
Black-and-white photographs
Photographs of the United States
Christian prayer
Christian art
1910s photographs